Bradley L. Berry (born April 1, 1965) is a Canadian former professional ice hockey player who played 241 games in the National Hockey League.  He played for the Winnipeg Jets, Minnesota North Stars, and Dallas Stars. He is currently the head coach for the University of North Dakota of the NCAA Division I NCHC.

Playing career
Berry joined the then Fighting Sioux in 1983, playing in a limited role in his first season. For his second year with North Dakota Berry saw his points total more than triple and was included on Canada's world junior team that won a gold medal. Unfortunately the Fighting Sioux slipped to fourth place in the standings and weren't able to earn a bid into the NCAA tournament. After another year with a similar result Berry forwent his senior season and turned pro with the Winnipeg Jets who had drafted him in the second round of the 1983 draft. In doing so, Berry missed out on North Dakota's National Championship the following year.

Berry finished the 1986 season playing 16 games for the Jets (3 in the playoffs) and suited up for a further 52 matches in his first full campaign as a professional. In 1987-88 Berry wasn't producing like the Jets were expecting so he spent a 10-game stint in the minors followed by an additional 38 the next year. By 1989-90 Berry was down to 12 NHL games and rather than see those dwindle even further he headed to Sweden to play for Brynäs IF in 1990. After a season in the Swedish Elite League Berry returned to North America to play for the Kalamazoo Wings. He earned a brief call-up to the parent Minnesota North Stars at the end of the season and stuck around for 63 contests in 1992-93. When the team moved south to Dallas in 1993 so did Berry's NHL career and he only saw 8 games with the Stars that season before being sent down to the minors. Berry would continue to play for Dallas' farm team until his retirement in 1999.

Coaching career
After hanging up his skates, Berry returned to North Dakota as an assistant coach just after the team had won its seventh National Title. Berry stayed with the team for six seasons before taking an AHL assistant coaching position with the Manitoba Moose. After a two-year term, Berry was a scout for the Vancouver Canucks for another two seasons before returning behind the bench as an assistant for the Columbus Blue Jackets. In his second year with Columbus, the Jackets had a disastrous season that saw head coach Scott Arniel fired at the midway point. While another assistant, Todd Richards, was given the reins, Berry left and returned once more to Grand Forks for his second stint as an assistant with his alma mater.

After three years Berry was named head coach for the University of North Dakota when Dave Hakstol was hired to coach of the Philadelphia Flyers. In his premier season Berry became the first coach in NCAA history to lead his team to a National Title in his inaugural campaign.

Career statistics

Regular season and playoffs

International

Head coaching record

References

External links

1965 births
Brynäs IF players
Canadian expatriate ice hockey players in Sweden
Canadian ice hockey coaches
Canadian ice hockey defencemen
Columbus Blue Jackets coaches
Dallas Stars players
Kalamazoo Wings (1974–2000) players
Living people
Manitoba Moose coaches
Minnesota North Stars players
Moncton Hawks players
North Dakota Fighting Hawks men's ice hockey coaches
North Dakota Fighting Hawks men's ice hockey players
People from Camrose County
Sherwood Park Crusaders players
St. Albert Saints players
Vancouver Canucks scouts
Winnipeg Jets (1979–1996) draft picks
Winnipeg Jets (1979–1996) players